, (July 9, 1958 – ) is a Japanese comedian, actress, singer and tarento from Higashisumiyoshi Ward (now Hirano Ward), Osaka, Osaka Prefecture, belonging to the Wahaha talent agency. She is also, as of 2007, the head of the fine arts department of Soka Gakkai which she became an adherent on September 28, 1984. She often promotes the conservative Soka Gakkai-backed political party Komeito as a public speaker.

She often works with her younger sister, .

She has become something of an internet meme on video sharing websites, where users create MAD Movies out of videos of her television appearances and promotional videos for Soka Gakkai. However, since 2014, on Nico Nico Douga and YouTube, videos get removed by Shinano Art (sometimes called "Shiano Art" or "Shinano Kikaku").

References 

1958 births
Living people
Japanese actresses
Japanese Buddhists
Japanese women comedians
Members of Sōka Gakkai
People from Osaka